Kenny Willekes (born July 22, 1997) is an American football defensive end for the Minnesota Vikings of the National Football League (NFL). He played college football at Michigan State.

Early years
Willekes attended NorthPointe Christian High School in Grand Rapids, Michigan. He played linebacker and running back in high school. He had 423 tackles during his high school football career.

College career
Willekes joined Michigan State University as a walk-on in 2015. He redshirted his first year and played in one game in 2016. In 2017, Willekes became a starter, starting 12 of 13 games. He finished the season with 72 tackles and seven sacks. In 2018, he was named the  Big Ten Conference Smith-Brown Defensive Lineman of the Year after recording 78 tackles and 8.5 sacks. Willekes returned to Michigan State his senior year in 2019 rather than enter the 2019 NFL Draft. During the season he broke Julian Peterson's school record for career tackles for loss. He was named the 2019 recipient of the Burlsworth Trophy on December 9, 2019, in Springdale, Arkansas, during a reception hosted by the Brandon Burlsworth Foundation in conjunction with the Springdale Rotary Club at the Springdale Convention Center.

Professional career

Willekes was selected by the Minnesota Vikings with the 225th pick in the seventh round of the 2020 NFL Draft. He was placed on injured reserve on September 2, 2020.

On August 31, 2021, Willekes was waived by the Vikings and re-signed to the practice squad the next day. He was promoted to the active roster on January 8, 2022.

On June 2, 2022, Willekes was waived/injured by the Vikings and placed on injured reserve.

References

External links
Minnesota Vikings bio
Michigan State Spartans bio

1997 births
Living people
People from Rockford, Michigan
Players of American football from Michigan
American football defensive ends
Michigan State Spartans football players
Minnesota Vikings players